2017–18 Albanian Cup was the sixty-sixth season of Albania's annual cup competition. Tirana are the defending champions. Skënderbeu won the title for the first time in their history.

Ties are played in a two-legged format similar to those of European competitions. If the aggregate score is tied after both games, the team with the higher number of away goals advances. If the number of away goals is equal in both games, the match is decided by extra time and a penalty shoot-out, if necessary.

Preliminary round
In order to reduce the number of participating teams for the first round to 32, a preliminary tournament is played. In contrast to the main tournament, the preliminary tournament is held as a single-leg knock-out competition. Matches were played on 6 September 2017 and involved the four best teams from Albanian Second Division.

|-

|}

First round
All 28 teams of the 2017–18 Superliga and First Division entered in this round along with the two qualifiers from the preliminary round. The first legs were played on 13 September 2017 and the second legs took place on 27 September 2017.

|}

Kukësi advanced to the second round.

Partizani advanced to the second round.

KF Skënderbeu advanced to the second round.

Luftëtari advanced to the second round.

Teuta advanced to the second round.

Laçi advanced to the second round.

Vllaznia advanced to the second round.

Flamurtari advanced to the second round.

Tirana advanced to the second round.

Turbina advanced to the second round.

Kamza advanced to the second round.

Lushnja advanced to the second round.

Besëlidhja advanced to the second round.

Bylis advanced to the second round.

Erzeni advanced to the second round.

Pogradeci advanced to the second round.

Second round
All  the 16 qualified teams from the first round progressed to the second round. The first legs were played on 29 November 2017 and the second legs took place on 13 December 2017.

|}

Kukësi advanced to the quarter finals.

Skënderbeu advanced to the quarter finals.

Teuta advanced to the quarter finals.

Tirana advanced to the quarter finals.

Partizani advanced to the quarter finals.

Luftëtari advanced to the quarter finals.

Laçi advanced to the quarter finals.

Flamurtari advanced to the quarter finals.

Quarter-finals
All eight qualified teams from the second round progressed to the quarter-finals. The first legs were played on 31 January 2018 and the second legs took place on 14 February 2018.

|}

Kukësi advanced to the semi finals.

Skënderbeu advanced to the semi finals.

Flamurtari advanced to the semi finals.

Laçi advanced to the semi finals.

Semi-finals
The first legs were played on 4 April and the second legs were played on 18 April 2018.

|}

Laçi advanced to the final.

Skënderbeu advanced to the final.

Final

References

https://web.archive.org/web/20170831180219/http://newsport.al/2017/08/lajmi-fundit-percaktohet-shorti-kupes-se-shqiperise-mesoni-kur-luan-skuadra-juaj/ (in Albanian)
https://web.archive.org/web/20171001165716/http://www.fshf.org/index.php/sq/lajme/5785-kupa-e-shqiperise-edicioni-2017-2018 (in Albanian)

Cup
Albanian Cup seasons
Albanian Cup